Linn Svahn (born 9 December 1999) is a Swedish cross-country skier who represents the club Östersunds SK. On 14 December 2019, she won her first World Cup competition, when winning a sprint competition in Davos, Grisons, Switzerland.

Cross-country skiing results
All results are sourced from the International Ski Federation (FIS).

World Championships

World Cup

Season titles
 2 titles – (1 sprint, 1 U23)

Season standings

Individual podiums
 9 victories – (5 , 4 ) 
 10 podiums – (6 , 4 )

Team podiums
 3 victories – (3 ) 
 4 podiums – (4 )

References

External links 

1999 births
Living people
Swedish female cross-country skiers
People from Lycksele Municipality
21st-century Swedish women